The Barrows Bearhawk, now also called the Barrows 4-Place Bearhawk, is an American amateur-built aircraft, designed by Bob Barrows and produced by R&B Aircraft of Fincastle, Virginia, AviPro Aircraft and now Bearhawk Aircraft of Austin, Texas. The aircraft is supplied as a kit or as plans for amateur construction.

Design and development
The Bearhawk was designed as a personal project by Barrows to carry aircraft engines for delivery as freight.

The aircraft fuselage is made from welded steel tubing covered in doped aircraft fabric, while the wings are made from aluminum sheet. Construction time from the supplied kit is 1200 hours.

The prototype was fitted with a  Lycoming O-360 burning automotive fuel.

Operational history
By October 2016, 77 examples had been registered in the United States with the Federal Aviation Administration and 11 with Transport Canada.

Variants

Bearhawk (4-Place Bearhawk)
Employs a NACA 4412 airfoil.
Bearhawk Bravo
Improved model introduced at AirVenture in July 2016. The wing has a  greater span and  greater area and employs a Riblett 30-413.5 airfoil, which gives a  higher top speed while retaining a low stall speed. The redesigned airframe also uses aluminum fuselage formers, window sills and door sills, replacing the steel formers and sills in the original model, which provides better corrosion resistance and less weight. The landing gear struts are made of heavy-wall round cross section tubing rather than streamlined tubing, which provides more resistance to sideload failure.
Patrol
Companion
First customer deliveries in October 2019.

Specifications (Bearhawk)

References

External links

Homebuilt aircraft
Single-engined tractor aircraft
1990s United States civil utility aircraft
Bearhawk
High-wing aircraft